Chorley is a constituency in Lancashire represented in the House of Commons of the UK Parliament since 1997 by Lindsay Hoyle. Hoyle was originally elected for the Labour Party, but in 2019 became the Speaker, making him unaffiliated.

Constituency profile
Chorley constituency consists of the majority of the borough of Chorley. As well as the central market town of Chorley itself, the seat extends into southern Lancashire rural hinterland with three major villages and minor villages.

Chorley's expansion is assured with the building of Buckshaw Village, an urban development sprawling over the former Royal Ordnance Site east of Leyland in the seat.

Boundaries

1885–1918: The Sessional Division of Leyland Hundred, and part of the Sessional Division of Leyland.

1918–1950: The Municipal Borough of Chorley, the Urban Districts of Adlington, Croston, Leyland, and Withnell, the Rural District of Chorley, and in the Rural District of Wigan the civil parishes of Haigh, Parbold, Worthington, and Wrightington.

1950–1955: The Municipal Borough of Chorley, the Urban Districts of Adlington and Leyland, and the Rural District of Chorley.

1955–1983: The Municipal Borough of Chorley, the Urban Districts of Adlington, Leyland and Withnell, and the Rural District of Chorley.

1983–1997: The Borough of Chorley, and the District of West Lancashire wards of Parbold and Wrightington.

1997–2010: The Borough of Chorley.

2010–present: The Borough of Chorley wards of Adlington and Anderton, Astley and Buckshaw, Brindle and Hoghton, Chisnall, Chorley East, Chorley North East, Chorley North West, Chorley South East, Chorley South West, Clayton-le-Woods and Whittle-le-Woods, Clayton-le-Woods North, Clayton-le-Woods West and Cuerden, Coppull, Euxton North, Euxton South, Heath Charnock and Rivington, Pennine, and Wheelton and Withnell.

Following their review of parliamentary representation in Lancashire leading up to the 2010 United Kingdom general election the Boundary Commission for England created a new seat of Wyre and Preston North in the central part of the county, which caused "knock-on" effects elsewhere. Chorley constituency was one of the largest in electorate at the start of the review, which was a factor in the alterations to both its own composition and the changes to surrounding constituencies. These changes took away from the seat all the areas to the west of the M6 motorway, namely Croston, Eccleston, Bretherton and Mawdesley. These move to South Ribble.

History
Since the 1945 general election Chorley has proved to be a bellwether, changing hands between Labour and the Conservatives; however, this pattern was broken in 2010 when Labour MP Lindsay Hoyle retained the seat against the national trend. Chorley itself is Labour's strongest seat in the area, with the rural hinterland and smaller towns and villages more inclined to vote Conservative.

Members of Parliament
Lindsay Hoyle has been MP for Chorley since 1997 as a member of the Labour Party. In November 2019 Hoyle was elected as Speaker of the House of Commons following the resignation of John Bercow; Sir Lindsay had been Deputy Speaker of the House of Commons under Bercow since 2010.

There is an inconsistently followed convention, which is mostly kept by the major parties, not to oppose the Speaker at elections. In keeping with this, the previously announced Liberal Democrat candidate, Paul Valentine, subsequently withdrew from the general election once Sir Lindsay was appointed Speaker. However the Green Party candidate, James Melling, confirmed that he will stand against the incumbent Speaker.

Elections

Elections in the 2010s
The Liberal Democrats, the Conservatives, and Labour traditionally do not stand against the sitting Speaker of the House of Commons, and consequently did not oppose Lindsay Hoyle's re-election bid. The Brexit Party did not stand an official candidate, however their former candidate stood as an independent, having changed his ballot name to Mark Brexit-Smith. The Green Party does not follow the convention of standing aside for the Speaker, and also fielded a candidate in the election.

Elections in the 2000s

Elections in the 1990s

Elections in the 1980s

Elections in the 1970s

Elections in the 1960s

Elections in the 1950s

Elections in the 1940s

Elections in the 1930s

Elections in the 1920s

Elections in the 1910s

General Election 1914–15:
Another General Election was required to take place before the end of 1915. The political parties had been making preparations for an election to take place and by July 1914, the following candidates had been selected; 
Unionist: Henry Hibbert
Liberal: John Peter Todd Jackson

Elections in the 1900s

Elections in the 1890s

Elections in the 1880s

See also
List of parliamentary constituencies in Lancashire

Notes

References

Sources
UK General Elections since 1832 (Keele University)

External links 
nomis Constituency Profile for Chorley — presenting data from the ONS annual population survey and other official statistics.

Parliamentary constituencies in North West England
Constituencies of the Parliament of the United Kingdom established in 1885
Politics of Chorley